Calathus fimbriatus is a species of ground beetle from the Platyninae subfamily that is endemic to Madeira.

References

fimbriatus
Beetles described in 1858
Endemic fauna of Madeira
Beetles of Europe